The following is the official canvassing of votes by the Congress of the Philippines for the 1957 Philippine presidential election.

Presidential election

Vice presidential election

References 

1957 in the Philippines